Prisoner Zero is an Australian animated children's sci-fi, action-adventure series produced by Planet 55 Studios. Planet 55 Studios was in reality part of the Big Finish group of companies. Many of the actors involved in the audio drama released by Big Finish Productions Limited had agreed through their contracts for release of their work on compact disc, yet not in digital download format, which required an additional fee to be paid to them all. Prisoner Zero follows the adventures of Tag, Gem, and Del and their mysterious friend Prisoner Zero. These four friends have a mission to free those enslaved across the cosmos from the evil Imperium, led by General Vykar.

Premise
The series follows two teen heroes, Tag and Gem, with their friend, the title character Prisoner Zero. They must stop the Imperium, who have enslaved humanity through a digital system, the Bioweve, by freeing the population and stop the evil General Vykar.

Characters 
Prisoner Zero: a mysterious man who is the friend of Tag, Gem, and Del. His memory has been wiped by the Imperium, perhaps multiple times. Voiced by Alexander Vlahos.

Del Rev: a slightly reckless rebel who is married to Bowi. Voiced by John Schwab. In a previous incarnation, executive produced by Austen Atkinson, Robert Firth portrayed Del Rev in 4 episodes. He was unavailable for the reboot.

Gem Coll: a feisty 14-year-old girl who stole the ship Rogue from Cav Anaton. Her parents died when she was young, and she thinks of Del and Bowi as her dads.

Tag Anaton: a 14-year-old boy who is initially reluctant to join the crew of the Rogue. He is the son of a prominent Imperium family and often acts like a spoiled brat, but his hacking genius has helped the crew on multiple occasions.

Guardian: an android (not a robot) programmed to protect Tag Anaton. Later he was integrated with the Rogue's AI system.

Librarian: an 8-foot-tall blue alien wizard that lives in the bowels of the ship. Although he develops a close friendship with Zero, he has secrets and motives of his own. Voiced by Gary Martin.

General Rakshiff Vykar: the main series villain. He seeks ultimate power and is willing to destroy anyone who gets in his way.

Episodes

Production
The series was first pitched to the ABC in 2012 as a replacement for Star Wars: The Clone Wars. The show would be the first to have its animation entirely produced in Australia. The show's storytelling was influenced by a mix of traditional western storytelling like Avatar: The Last Airbender and Doctor Who, with the animation style influenced by Japanese anime. Gary Russell served as the executive producer and lead writer with Josh Campbell as series producer and director.

Although no information regarding a second series has been released, the series finale as well as comments by Campbell imply that one was at least planned at some point.

DVD release
The first DVD "Rogue" was released as a Region 4 single disc on 2 November 2016 by ABC in Australia. The second release "History" was released as a Region 4 single disc on 1 February 2017 by ABC in Australia. The third release "The Codec" was released as a Region 4 single disc on 7 June 2017 by ABC in Australia.

See also
 List of Australian television series

References

External links
 

2010s Australian animated television series
2016 Australian television series debuts
Anime-influenced Western animated television series
Australian children's animated action television series
Australian children's animated adventure television series
Australian children's animated science fiction television series
Australian Broadcasting Corporation original programming
English-language television shows
LGBT-related animated series
Teen animated television series